Leonel dos Santos Matonse (born October 14, 1988) is a Mozambican swimmer, who specialized in sprint freestyle events. Matonse qualified for the men's 100 m freestyle, as a 15-year-old, at the 2004 Summer Olympics in Athens, by receiving a Universality place from FINA, in an entry time of 59.87. He challenged six other swimmers in heat one, including 34-year-old Mumtaz Ahmed of Pakistan. He set a Mozambican record of 57.79 to earn a third spot by nearly a second behind winner Mohammed Abbas of Iraq. Matonse failed to advance into the semifinals, as he placed sixty-fifth overall out of 71 swimmers in the preliminaries.

References

External links
 

1988 births
Living people
Mozambican male freestyle swimmers
Commonwealth Games competitors for Mozambique
Swimmers at the 2006 Commonwealth Games
Olympic swimmers of Mozambique
Swimmers at the 2004 Summer Olympics
Sportspeople from Maputo